Tim Moresco (born October 3, 1954) is a former defensive back in the National Football League (NFL). He was drafted by the Green Bay Packers in the sixth round of the 1977 NFL Draft and played that season with the team. The following three seasons he would play with the New York Jets.

References

1954 births
Living people
Sportspeople from Ithaca, New York
Green Bay Packers players
New York Jets players
American football defensive backs
Syracuse Orange football players